Clostera is a genus of moths of the family Notodontidae. It consists of the following species:
 Clostera aello (Schintlmeister & Fang, 2001)
 Clostera albosigma (Fitch, 1856)
 Clostera anachoreta (Denis & Schiffermüller, 1775)
 Clostera anastomosis (Linnaeus, 1758)
 Clostera angularis (Snellen, 1895)
 Clostera apicalis (Walker, 1855)
 Clostera bramah (Roepke, 1944)
 Clostera bramoides (Holloway, 1983)
 Clostera brucei (H. Edwards, 1885)
 Clostera costicomma (Hampson, 1892)
 Clostera curtula (Linnaeus, 1758)
 Clostera curtuloides (Erschoff, 1870)
 Clostera dorsalis (Walker, 1862)
 Clostera ferruginea (Hampson, 1910)
 Clostera fulgurita (Walker, 1865)
 ? Clostera hildora (Schaus)
 Clostera inclusa (Hübner, 1829)
 Clostera inornata (Neumoegen, 1882)
 ? Clostera javana (Moore)
 Clostera obscurior (Staudinger, 1887)
 Clostera pallida (Walker, 1855)
 Clostera paraphora (Dyar, 1921)
 Clostera pigra (Hufnagel, 1766)
 Clostera powelli (Oberthür, 1914)
 Clostera restitura (Walker, 1865)
 Clostera rubida (Druce, 1901)
 Clostera strigosa (Grote, 1882)
 ? Clostera tapa (Roepke)
 ? Clostera transecta (Dudgeon)
 Clostera voeltzkowi (Aurivilius, 1909)

External links
 

Notodontidae
Taxa named by George Samouelle